Cimenná is a village and municipality in Bánovce nad Bebravou District in the Trenčín Region of north-western Slovakia.

History
In historical records the village was first mentioned in 1484.

Geography
The municipality lies at an altitude of 270 metres and covers an area of 3.6 km². It has a population of about 82 people.

Genealogical resources

The records for genealogical research are available at the state archive "Statny Archiv in Bratislava, Nitra, Slovakia"

 Roman Catholic church records (births/marriages/deaths): 1782-1896 (parish B)

See also
 List of municipalities and towns in Slovakia

References

External links
  Official page
https://web.archive.org/web/20071217080336/http://www.statistics.sk/mosmis/eng/run.html
Surnames of living people in Cimenna

Villages and municipalities in Bánovce nad Bebravou District